Renzo Imbeni (12 October 1944 – 22 February 2005) was an Italian politician, Mayor of Bologna from 1983 to 1993.

Biography 
Imbeni graduated in Economics at the University of Bologna and in 1972 he was elected Secretary of the Italian Communist Youth Federation, the youth association of the Italian Communist Party.

From 1976 to 1983, Imbeni has been the city secretary of the PCI in Bologna, until he has been appointed Mayor of Bologna after the resignation of his predecessor Renato Zangheri who was elected to the Chamber of Deputies.

Imbeni's administration dealt with the consequences of the Years of Lead attacks in Bologna, pursuing the idea of the city as a "happy island" during very difficult times.

Imbeni upheld the rights of women and homosexuals, arguing that democracy should be based on differences and the plurality of voices.

From 1989 to 2004, Imbeni has been elected to the European Parliament, serving as vice-president of the European Parliament from 1994 to 2004.

Imbeni died on 22 February 2005 at the age of 60, after a long illness.

References 

1944 births
2005 deaths
Politicians from Modena
Italian Communist Party politicians
Democratic Party of the Left politicians
Democrats of the Left politicians
20th-century Italian politicians
21st-century Italian politicians
Mayors of Bologna